The 913th Aircraft Control and Warning Squadron is an inactive United States Air Force unit. It was last assigned to the Sault Sainte Marie Air Defense Sector, Air Defense Command, stationed at Pagwa Air Station, Ontario, Canada. It was inactivated on 1 June 1963.

The unit was a General Surveillance Radar squadron providing for the air defense of North America.

Lineage
 Constituted as the 913th Aircraft Control and Warning Squadron
 Activated on 10 March 1952
 Inactivated on 1 June 1963

Assignments
 32d Air Division, 10 March 1952
 30th Air Division, 20 December 1952
 4708th Defense Wing (later 4708th Air Defense Wing), 16 February 1953
 37th Air Division, 8 July 1956
 30th Air Division, 1 April 1959
 Sault Sainte Marie Air Defense Sector, 1 April 1960 – 1 June 1963

Stations
 Grenier AFB, Maine, 10 March 1952
 Pagwa Air Station, Ontario, Canada, 20 December 1952 – 1 June 1963

References

 Cornett, Lloyd H. and Johnson, Mildred W., A Handbook of Aerospace Defense Organization  1946 - 1980,  Office of History, Aerospace Defense Center, Peterson AFB, CO (1980).

External links

Radar squadrons of the United States Air Force
Aerospace Defense Command units